Daviesia abnormis is a species of flowering plant in the family Fabaceae and is endemic to the south-west of Western Australia. It is an erect, hairy shrub with sharply-pointed, narrow elliptic to narrow egg-shaped phyllodes with the narrower end towards the base, and yellow flowers with faint red markings.

Description

Taxonomy and naming
Daviesia abnormis was first formally described in 1860 by Ferdinand von Mueller in Fragmenta Phytographiae Australiae from specimens collected by George Maxwell. The specific epithet (abnormis) means "irregular" or "unconventional".

Distribution
This species of pea mainly grows in kwongan in the Esperance Plains and Mallee biogeographic regions in the south-west of Western Australia.

Conservation status
This daviesia is classified as "not threatened" by the Government of Western Australia Department of Biodiversity, Conservation and Attractions.

References

abnormis
Eudicots of Western Australia
Plants described in 1860
Taxa named by Ferdinand von Mueller